Platinum is a city in Bethel Census Area, Alaska, United States. The population was 61 at the 2010 census, up from 41 in 2000.

Geography
It is located on Goodnews Bay adjacent to the mouth of the Small River and eleven miles southwest of Goodnews and the Kilbuck Mountains.

Climate
Platinum has a subarctic climate (Dfc) with short, cool and rainy summers and long, cold winters with moderate snowfall peaking during March.

History
Platinum was named in the 1930s due to the platinum ore found in the area. The site was a mining boomtown by 1937 boasting a roadhouse, two trading posts and a population of fifty. A post office had been established in 1935. An earlier Inuit village called Arviq had been abandoned. The town was incorporated as a city in 1975.

Ray Petersen Flying Service was awarded the exclusive contract in 1937 to fly for the Goodnews Bay platinum and iridium mine, hauling miners and company supplies out of his base at Bethel, Alaska.

During World War II, the Alaska Territorial Guard served to safeguard it against Japanese attack as it was the only source of the strategic metal platinum in the Western Hemisphere.

Demographics

Platinum first appeared on the 1940 U.S. Census as an unincorporated village. It formally incorporated in 1975.

As of the census of 2000, there were 41 people, 17 households, and 9 families residing in the city. The population density was 0.9 people per square mile (0.4/km2). There were 26 housing units at an average density of 0.6 per square mile (0.2/km2). The racial makeup of the city was 7.32% White, 90.24% Native American, and 2.44% from two or more races.

There were 17 households, out of which 47.1% had children under the age of 18 living with them, 29.4% were married couples living together, 11.8% had a female householder with no husband present, and 41.2% were non-families. 41.2% of all households were made up of individuals, and none had someone living alone who was 65 years of age or older. The average household size was 2.41 and the average family size was 2.90.

In the city, the age distribution of the population shows 26.8% under the age of 18, 2.4% from 18 to 24, 43.9% from 25 to 44, 17.1% from 45 to 64, and 9.8% who were 65 years of age or older. The median age was 32 years. For every 100 females, there were 105.0 males. For every 100 females age 18 and over, there were 130.8 males.

The median income for a household in the city was $21,250, and the median income for a family was $22,500. The per capita income for the city was $7,632. There are 33.3% of families living below the poverty line and 22.0% of the population, including 33.3% of under eighteens and none of those over 64

Education
Lower Kuskokwim School District operates the Arviq School, K-12. Due to a decline in student enrollment it closed in Spring 2001, but it reopened in October 2007.  the school had 20 students.

Geology

In 1926, Walter Smith, an Eskimo, discovered what he thought was "white gold" at the mouth of Fox Gulch, a tributary of Platinum Creek.  Samples sent to the United States Bureau of Mines in Fairbanks determined it was actually platinum.  In 1928, Charles Thorsen discovered platinum in Clara Creek, while Edward St. Clair discovered platinum in Squirrel Creek.  Consolidation of the subsequent mining claims resulted in Goodnews Bay Mining Co. and Clara Creek Mining Co. becoming the major operators mining these placer deposits containing 60 per cent platinum and 22 percent iridium.  The largest nugget was found on Squirrel Creek and weighed 1.5 ounces.  These placers are found in the drainage east of Red Mountain, which is composed of dunite.  However, platinum has not been found on the mountain.  Goodnews Bay Mining Co. started operating a dragline excavator on Squirrel Creek on 11 Aug. 1934, and on Platinum Creek and Fox Gulch in 1937.  The company started operations with a dredge in Nov. 1937.  The Clara Creek Mining Co. started mining operations on Clara Creek in 1936.  A total of 3000 ounces of platinum metals were recovered from all mining operations between 1927 and 1934, and 18,000 ounces between 1934 and 1937.

References

Cities in Alaska
Cities in Bethel Census Area, Alaska
Mining communities in Alaska
Populated coastal places in Alaska on the Pacific Ocean